Haytarma ( — «return», «homecoming») is a 2013 Ukrainian period drama film. It portrays Crimean Tatar  flying ace and Hero of the Soviet Union Amet-khan Sultan against the background of the 1944 deportation of the Crimean Tatars. The title of the film means "Return". Haytarma is also the name of the most popular Crimean Tatar national dance.

Production and release
Production of the film began in October 2012 in Crimea. The initial budget for the film was US$2.5 million. The funds were provided by Lenur İslâm, owner of Ukrainian television station ATR Channel. Much expenditure was devoted to scenic design and costume design. A preview of the film was released in March 2013. The premiere was scheduled for 18 May 2013, the 69th anniversary of the deportations; Amet-Khan's granddaughter Veronika, Soviet Air Force pilots, Russian generals, and ambassadors of foreign countries were invited to attend.

Reactions
The Kyiv Post gave a positive review, describing Haytarma as a "must-see for history enthusiasts". In Simferopol, the Kosmos Cinema estimates that six thousand people saw the film in the first week, and one thousand per day by 4 June; the cinema had begun with just two screenings per day, but added two additional ones in response to the unexpected popularity. It was screened at the International Antalya Golden Orange Film Festival in October 2013. It was one of three films which made the Ukraine Oscar selection committee's shortlist to be submitted as a nominee in the Best Foreign Language Film category at the 86th Academy Awards.

Russian Consul in Simferopol Vladimir Andreev provoked public controversy for his comments that the film "distorts the truth" with its failure to mention alleged collaborationism by Crimean Tatars during Nazi Germany's occupation of Ukraine. He told several prominent Russian generals invited to the premiere to not attend, and said that the Crimean Tatars deserved to be deported, provoking a massive backlash. He later admitted that he did not actually watch the movie, saying "I did not watch [Seitablaev’s] film, but I know it is based on falsified history because it was produced by Crimean Tatars". Members of the public took expressed disgust, and on 23 May 2013 about 300 people held a protest outside the consulate demanding that Andreev be declared persona non grata, while the Ukrainian Ministry of Foreign Affairs described Andreev's remarks as "inappropriate". Andreev initially stood by his Tatarophobic remarks made without knowledge of the movie's content and refused to retract them, but the following day the Russian Ministry of Foreign Affairs also described Andreev's words as inappropriate and incorrect. Eventually he resigned in anger that the Russian government did not support his comments.

References

External links

2013 films
Ukrainian drama films
Russian-language Ukrainian films
Crimean Tatar-language films
Films shot in Crimea